Dennis Dowouna (born 18 May 2000) is a Ghanaian professional footballer currently playing as a midfielder for Miami.

Career statistics

Club
.

Notes

References

2000 births
Living people
Ghanaian footballers
Association football midfielders
Kategoria Superiore players
KF Skënderbeu Korçë players
Miami FC players
Ghanaian expatriate footballers
Ghanaian expatriate sportspeople in Albania
Expatriate footballers in Albania
Ghanaian expatriate sportspeople in the United States
Expatriate soccer players in the United States
21st-century Ghanaian people
USL Championship players